Gnathothlibus meeki is a moth of the  family Sphingidae. It is known from Papua New Guinea. It prefers mountainous areas.

The species name honours Albert Stewart Meek.

References

Gnathothlibus
Taxa named by Walter Rothschild
Taxa named by Karl Jordan
Moths described in 1907